The Cushing Land Agency Building is located in St. Croix Falls, Wisconsin. It was added to the National Register of Historic Places in 2005.

History
The Cushing Land Agency was created in 1854 by U.S. Attorney General Caleb Cushing. He later sold the company and its name was eventually changed to the Baker Land and Title Company. The building currently houses the St. Croix Falls Historical Society.

References

External links
 St Croix Falls Historical Society website
 St. Croix Falls Historical Society - Falls Chamber of Commerce

Buildings and structures in Polk County, Wisconsin
Commercial buildings on the National Register of Historic Places in Wisconsin
Historical society museums in Wisconsin
Queen Anne architecture in Wisconsin
Stick-Eastlake architecture in the United States
Commercial buildings completed in 1882
Museums in Polk County, Wisconsin
National Register of Historic Places in Polk County, Wisconsin